Thomas Browne (1605–1682) was an English polymath and author.

Thomas Browne may also refer to:

Politics and law
 Thomas Browne (died 1460) (1402–1460), English MP and treasurer to Henry VI
 Thomas Browne (died 1597), English Member of Parliament (MP)
 Thomas Browne, 4th Viscount Kenmare (1726–1795), Irish landowner and politician
 Thomas C. Browne (1794–1858), American jurist and politician from Illinois
 Thomas Gore Browne (1807–1887), British colonial administrator; Governor of St Helena, New Zealand, Tasmania, and Bermuda
 Thomas M. Browne (1829–1891), U.S. Representative from Indiana
 Thomas Browne (Australian politician) (1838–1899), New South Wales politician
 Thomas H. B. Browne (1844–1892), U.S. Representative from Virginia

Religion
 Thomas Browne (Canon of Windsor) (–1673), English Anglican priest
 Thomas Browne (Master of Christ's College, Cambridge) (1766–1832), English priest and academic
 Thomas Browne (Archdeacon of Ipswich) (1889–1978), British Anglican priest

Others
 Thomas Browne (Master of Pembroke College, Cambridge) (1648–1706), English academic
 Thomas Browne II (1648–1715), early settler of Maryland
 Thomas Browne (officer of arms) (1708–1780), English officer of arms
 Thomas Alexander Browne (1826–1915) "Rolf Boldrewood", Australian writer

See also
 Thomas Brown (disambiguation)
 Tom Brown (disambiguation)
 Tom Browne (disambiguation)
 Tommy Brown (disambiguation)